Bārīkī   is a village in Khwahan Badakhshan Province in north-eastern Afghanistan.

References

External links
Bārīkī37°48'55" N, 70°19'7" E/maps

Populated places in Khwahan District